Gints Freimanis (born 9 May 1985) is a Latvian footballer, who  currently plays as a right-back for Saldus SS/Leevon.

International career
Gints Freimanis first call-up to the senior Latvia national team squad came in May 2014  for the Baltic Cup tournament and he made his national team debut coming as substitute in final game on 94th minute against Lithuania helping Latvia to win the trophy by a 1-0 scoreline.

International goals
Scores and results list Latvia's goal tally first.

Honours

Club 

FK Jelgava
Latvian Football Cup (4): 2009–10, 2013–14, 2014–15, 2015–16,

International 
Latvia
Baltic Cup (2): 2014, 2016

Individual 
 Best defender of 2016 Latvian Higher League

References

External links
 

1985 births
Living people
Association football midfielders
Latvian footballers
Latvian expatriate footballers
Latvia international footballers
FK Jelgava players
FK Ventspils players
RSK Dižvanagi players
FK Rīga players
St Patrick's Athletic F.C. players
FK Spartaks Jūrmala players
Latvian Higher League players
League of Ireland players
Latvian expatriate sportspeople in Germany
Expatriate association footballers in Ireland
Expatriate footballers in Germany